The 1998 Paegas Czech Open, also known as the Prague Open, was a men's tennis tournament played on outdoor clay courts in Prague, Czech Republic that was part of the World Series of the 1998 ATP Tour. It was the twelfth edition of the tournament and was held from 27 April until 3 May 1998. Unseeded Fernando Meligeni won the singles title.

Finals

Singles

 Fernando Meligeni defeated  Ctislav Doseděl, 6–1, 6–4.
 It was Meligeni's 1st singles title of the year and the 3rd and last of his career.

Doubles

 Wayne Arthurs /  Andrew Kratzmann defeated  Fredrik Bergh /  Nicklas Kulti, 6–1, 6–1.

See also
 1998 Skoda Czech Open – women's tournament

References

External links
 ITF tournament edition details

Prague Open
Prague Open (1987–1999)
1998 in Czech tennis